The 1937 Calgary Bronks season was the third season in franchise history where the team finished in 1st place in the Western Interprovincial Football Union with a 5–3 record. The Bronks played in the WIFU Finals, but lost to the Winnipeg Blue Bombers in a two-game series by a total points score of 19–14.

Regular season

Standings

Schedule

Playoffs

Winnipeg won the total-point series by 19–14. Winnipeg advances to the Grey Cup game.

References

1937 in Alberta
1937 in Canadian sports